Arthur Hollins Edens (February 14, 1901 – August 7, 1968) served as President of Duke University from 1949 to 1960. Duke's third president after the school's expansion from college to university, Edens was first president hired from outside the university since 1894, when John C. Kilgo was hired away from Wofford College. An executive with the Rockefeller Foundation and a native Southerner, Edens launched a capital gifts program and a national development campaign. The success of these efforts allowed Duke University to strengthen its endowment and experience a period of great growth during his presidency with the Duke University Union opening, academic units emerging, and the establishment of endowed professorships.

Notes

External links
 Duke's Presidents  
 Guide to the Records of A. Hollis Edens, University Archives, Duke University

1901 births
1968 deaths
Presidents of Duke University
20th-century American academics